Northcote Lodge School is an independent preparatory school for boys aged 8–13 in Wandsworth Common, South London.  The school's premises at 26 Bolingbroke Grove are the former location of Linden Lodge School for the Blind. The school was formerly owned and founded by Malcolm and Katharine Colquhoun. In 2021 Northcote Lodge became part of the Dukes Education family, with its sibling schools being Broomwood Hall Lower School (boys and girls 4-8) & Broomwood Hall Upper School (girls 8-13) and Northwood Senior (becoming London Park School in September 2023) (co-ed, 11-16).

Entry to Northcote Lodge is primarily via Broomwood Hall - there is also a 7+ entry and Academic and Music scholarships via Broomwood for boys interested in moving on to Northcote - but there are always some places for external candidates at 8.  The school also has some places at 11+ for boys who are looking to move on to a boarding/day schools at 13.

External links 
  website

Private boys' schools in London
Preparatory schools in London
Private schools in the London Borough of Wandsworth